St. Benedict is an unincorporated community in Nemaha County, Kansas, United States.  As of the 2020 census, the population of the community and nearby areas was 50.  It is located 3 miles north of the west edge of Seneca.

History
A post office was opened in Saint Benedict in 1883, and remained in operation until it was discontinued in 1902.

The community currently consists of over a dozen homes near the tall St. Mary's Church, which was built in 1893.

Demographics

For statistical purposes, the United States Census Bureau has defined this community as a census-designated place (CDP).

Education
The community is served by Nemaha Central USD 115 public school district.

References

Further reading

 A Socio-Economic Analysis of four Rural Parishes in Nemaha County Kansas; Gilbert F. Wolters; The Catholic University of America; 206 pages; 1938.

External links
 St Mary's Church
 Nemaha County maps: Current, Historic, KDOT

Unincorporated communities in Nemaha County, Kansas
Unincorporated communities in Kansas
1883 establishments in Kansas
Populated places established in 1883